Haroldia may refer to:
 Haroldia (fly), a genus of flies in the family Asilidae
 Haroldia (plant), a genus of plants in the family Asteraceae